Matthew Reed (born November 30, 1951) is an American former gridiron football player. He played professionally as a quarterback in the World Football League (WFL) and the Canadian Football League (CFL).

A graduate of Grambling State University, Reed was a tenth-round selection (240th overall pick) of the Buffalo Bills in the 1973 NFL Draft but did not play in the league. Reed began his pro career with the Birmingham Americans of the WFL. In 1974, he backed up George Mira, completing 77 of 188 passes (41%) for 1345 yards and 11 touchdowns and 12 interceptions. He was part of their championship team. In 1975, he became starter of the newly renamed Birmingham Vulcans, but had a poor year, completing only 38.9% of his 208 passes, for 1252 yards and only 4 touchdowns and 11 interceptions. He did rush for 347 yards and 6 touchdowns. In the WFL's short history, Reed manage to be the league's 10th leading passer (in yards).

Reed later played three years in the CFL, all as a back-up quarterback. He played 18 games for the Toronto Argonauts in 1976 and 1977 and finished his pro career with the Calgary Stampeders in 1977 and 1978. While with the Argonauts, Reed backed up CFL star Chuck Ealey. As noted in the Toronto sports press, this was the first time in professional football that a team had a tandem of black quarterbacks running a team.

References

 

Living people
1951 births
American football quarterbacks
Canadian football quarterbacks
Birmingham Americans players
Birmingham Vulcans players
Calgary Stampeders players
Grambling State Tigers football players
Toronto Argonauts players
African-American players of American football
African-American players of Canadian football
People from Winnfield, Louisiana
Players of American football from Louisiana
21st-century African-American people
20th-century African-American sportspeople